RCC1 and BTB domain-containing protein 2 is a protein that in humans is encoded by the RCBTB2 gene.

This gene encodes a member of the RCC1-related GEF family. The N-terminal half of the encoded amino acid sequence shows similarity to the regulator of chromosome condensation RCC1, which acts as a guanine nucleotide exchange factor (GEF) protein for the Ras-related GTPase Ran.

References

Further reading